David Jackman may refer to:
 David Jackman (musician)
 David Jackman (minister)
 David Jackman (politician)